Heideland is a municipality in the Elbe-Elster district, in Lower Lusatia, Brandenburg, Germany.

History
From 1815 to 1947, the constituent localities of Heideland (Eichholz, Drößig and Fischwasser) were part of the Prussian Province of Brandenburg. From 1952 to 1990, they were part of the Bezirk Cottbus of East Germany. On 31 December 2001, the municipality of Heideland was formed by merging the municipalities of Eichholz-Drößig and Fischwasser.

Demography

References

Localities in Elbe-Elster